Odin is a Swedish satellite working in two disciplines: astrophysics and aeronomy, and it was named after Odin of Norse mythology. Within the field of astrophysics, Odin was used until the spring of 2007 aiding in the study of star formation. Odin is still used for aeronomical observations, including exploration of the depletion of the ozone layer and effects of global warming. In February 2019 it celebrated 18 years in Earth orbit, and was still functioning nominally.

Overview
The main instrument on Odin is a radiometer using a 1.1 m telescope, designed to be used for both the astronomy and aeronomy missions. The radiometer works at 486–580 GHz and at 119 GHz. The second instrument on board is the OSIRIS (Optical Spectrograph and InfraRed Imager System).

Odin was developed by the Space Systems Division of Swedish Space Corporation (now OHB Sweden) as part of an international project involving the space agencies of Sweden (SNSB), Finland (TEKES), Canada (CSA) and France (CNES). Odin was launched on a START-1 rocket on 20 February 2001 from Svobodny, Russia.

In April 2007, astronomers announced that Odin had made the first ever detection of molecular oxygen in interstellar clouds. The spacecraft was still functioning nominally in 2010. It continues to function and as of 20 February 2019, is still functioning nominally.

Lists
International partners:

Agencies or organizations involved in Odin:
Swedish National Space Board
Swedish Space Corporation 
Canadian Space Agency
Natural Sciences and Engineering Research Council (of Canada)
National Technology Agency of Finland
CNES (France)

Objectives:
Astronomy 
Aeronomy applications 
Atmospheric research
Stratospheric ozone chemistry
Mesospheric ozone science
Summer mesospheric science
Coupling of atmospheric regions

Results
Examples:
Odin has observed water in comets.
Odin detected of molecular oxygen in interstellar clouds.
Odin observed carbon monoxide in the strato-mesosphere.
Odin has studied nitrous oxides in the atmosphere.

See also

Swedish National Space Agency
2001 Mars Odyssey (another spacecraft launched in 2001 that is still in use)
Submillimeter Wave Astronomy Satellite
Herschel Space Observatory

References

External links
Odin information at Swedish National Space Board
Odin information at OHB Sweden
ESA Third Party Missions Overview

Spacecraft launched in 2001
Geospace monitoring satellites
Space programme of Sweden
Submillimetre telescopes